Aliakbar Aghaei Moghanjoei (January 5, 1947 – April 8, 2015) was an Iranian politician.

Aghaei Moghanjoei was born in Salmas, West Azerbaijan. He was a member of the 2000, 2004, 2008 and 2012 Islamic Consultative Assembly from the electorate of Salmas and member of Iran-Turkey Friendship society. Aghaei Moghanjoei won with 42,026 (44.58%) votes. He served as:

 Legal Deputy of the Ministry of Roads
 Administrative and Financial Deputy of the Ministry of Roads
 Head of Presidential Institution
 Special Inspector to the Minister of Roads and Transportation
 Deputy Minister of Budget and Parliamentary Affairs, Ministry of Roads
 Deputy Minister of Legal Affairs and Parliamentary Affairs of the Ministry of Roads
 Representative of the people of Salmas in the sixth, seventh, eighth and ninth parliaments

References

External links
 Aghaei Moghanjoei Website

People from Salmas
Deputies of Salmas
1947 births
2015 deaths
Members of the 9th Islamic Consultative Assembly
Members of the 8th Islamic Consultative Assembly
Members of the 7th Islamic Consultative Assembly
Members of the 6th Islamic Consultative Assembly
Followers of Wilayat fraction members
Moderation and Development Party politicians